Verticordia dasystylis is a flowering plant in the myrtle family, Myrtaceae and is endemic to the south-west of Western Australia. It is a small shrub, with many stems at its base, oblong leaves and scented, fluffy, yellow and white flowers. There are three subspecies, each of which has a priority conservation status.

Description

Flowering time is from late September to early November.

Taxonomy and naming
Verticordia dasystylis was first formally described by Alex George in 1991 and the description was published in Nuytsia. The type collection was made near Yellowdine by George. The specific epithet (dasystylis) "is derived from the Greek dasys (hairy, shaggy) and stylos (style), in reference to the very hairy style".

In the same paper in 1991, George described three subspecies and the names have been accepted by the Australian Plant Census:

George placed this species in subgenus Verticordia, section Penicillaris with V. penicillaris.

Distribution and habitat
 Subspecies dasystylis occurs in the Yellowdine - Lake Seabrook area in the Coolgardie biogeographic region where it grows in shallow, granitic soil in rocky places;
 Subspecies kalbarriensis occurs near the southern part of the Kalbarri National Park in the Geraldton Sandplains biogeographic region where it grows in stony clay in winter-wet areas near sandplains;
 Subspecies oestopoia occurs near the Arrowsmith River, Eneabba and Bunjil in the Avon Wheatbelt and Geraldton Sandplains biogeographic regions where it grows in coarse sand or clay in open shrubland.

Conservation
 Subspecies dasystylis is classified as "Priority Two" by the Western Australian Government Department of Parks and Wildlife meaning that is poorly known and from only one or a few locations.
 Subspecies kalbarriensis is also classified as "Priority Two";
Subspecies oestopoia is classified as "Priority One" meaning that it is known from only one or a few locations which are potentially at risk.

Use in horticulture
All three subspecies have horticultural potential because of their attractive, "fluffy" flowers but further research into their requirements in cultivation is necessary before they are available as garden plants.

References

dasystylis
Endemic flora of Western Australia
Myrtales of Australia
Rosids of Western Australia
Plants described in 1991